The 2011 Franken Challenge was a professional tennis tournament played on clay courts. It was the 25th edition of the tournament which was part of the 2011 ATP Challenger Tour. It took place in Fürth, Germany between 30 May and 5 June 2011.

ATP entrants

Seeds

 Rankings are as of May 23, 2011.

Other entrants
The following players received wildcards into the singles main draw:
  Kevin Krawietz
  Jan-Lennard Struff
  Jean Zietsman
  Marcel Zimmermann

The following players received entry from the qualifying draw:
  Alexander Flock
  Peter Gojowczyk
  Romain Jouan
  Dieter Kindlmann

Champions

Singles

 João Sousa def.  Jan-Lennard Struff, 6–2, 0–6, 6–2

Doubles

 Rameez Junaid /  Frank Moser def.  Jorge Aguilar /  Júlio César Campozano, 6–2, 6–7(2), [10–6]

External links
Official Website
ITF Search 
ATP official site

Franken Challenge
Franken Challenge
Franken Challenge
Franken Challenge
Franken Challenge